Just Mercy is a 2019 American biographical legal drama film co-written and directed by Destin Daniel Cretton and starring Michael B. Jordan as Bryan Stevenson, Jamie Foxx as Walter McMillian, Rob Morgan, Tim Blake Nelson, Rafe Spall, and Brie Larson. It explores the work of young defense attorney Bryan Stevenson who represents poor people on death row in the South. Featured is his work with Walter McMillian, who had been wrongfully convicted of the murder of a young woman. The film is based on Stevenson's 2014 eponymous memoir, in which he explored his journey to making his life's work the defense of African American prisoners.

Just Mercy, which had its world premiere at the Toronto International Film Festival on September 6, 2019, was theatrically released by Warner Bros. Pictures on December 25, 2019. The film received positive reviews from critics and grossed $50.4 million. Foxx was nominated for Outstanding Performance by a Male Actor in a Supporting Role at the 26th Screen Actors Guild Awards. Both he and Michael B. Jordan won NAACP Image Awards for their respective roles.

Plot
In 1989, Harvard law graduate Bryan Stevenson travels to Alabama, intending to help defend poor people who cannot afford proper legal representation. Teaming with Eva Ansley, he forms the Equal Justice Initiative in the state capital, Montgomery. He embarks on trying to combat social injustices in criminal law and practice, which has resulted in a high rate of African Americans convicted and incarcerated in the state and nationwide.

Stevenson goes to a state prison to meet inmates who are on death row and who are seeking appeals of their convictions or sentences. Among these is Walter "Johnny D." McMillian, an African-American man who was convicted of the 1986 murder of Ronda Morrison, an 18-year-old white girl. McMillian has maintained his innocence. 

When Stevenson reviews the evidence in the case, he learns that it hinges entirely on the testimony of convicted felon Ralph Myers. The convict had provided highly contradictory testimony to the prosecution in exchange for a plea deal and lighter sentence in his own pending trial.

Given these issues, Stevenson appeals to the current prosecutor, Tommy Chapman, for aid; Chapman dismisses him without looking at Stevenson's notes. Stevenson learns that, at the time of the murder, McMillian's family friend Darnell Houston was elsewhere with a witness who had subsequently falsely corroborated Myers' testimony. This evidence would cause the prosecution's case to fall apart, and Stevenson asks Houston to testify to his account. When Stevenson submits Houston's testimony, police arrest Houston for perjury. 

Although Stevenson gets the perjury charges dismissed, Houston is intimidated and refuses to testify in court. Shortly afterward, Stevenson is threatened by two sheriff deputies, who force him from his car at gunpoint and illegally search the car. They refuse to tell him why he was pulled over, but release him.

During this period, Stevenson had a case on appeal to the U.S. Supreme Court on behalf of another death row inmate, Herbert Lee Richardson; the court denied the appeal. Convicted of killing his ex-girlfriend’s niece with a bomb on her porch, Richardson had been sentenced to death by electric chair. Unable to overturn this, Stevenson promised to be with Richardson in his final moments and witnesses the execution.

On behalf of McMillian, Stevenson directly confronts Myers. He admits that police coerced his testimony by threatening him with a death sentence. Stevenson appeals to the local court to grant McMillian a retrial and successfully convinces Myers to recant his testimony on the stand, but the judge refuses to grant a retrial. 

Stevenson appears on 60 Minutes to rally public support in favor of McMillian, and appeals the court's decision to the Supreme Court of Alabama. The Supreme Court overturns the circuit court's decision, and grants McMillian a retrial. Stevenson tries to have the charges dismissed entirely. He confronts Chapman at home and tries to convince him to join in this motion; Chapman forces him to leave. 

On the day of the motion, Stevenson appeals to the judge. That day Chapman joins him in the motion, the judge dismisses the charges, and McMillian is finally released from prison and reunited with his family.

An epilogue notes that Stevenson and Ansley continue their fight for justice. McMillian remained friends with Stevenson until his natural death in 2013. A follow-up investigation into Morrison's 1986 murder confirmed McMillian's innocence. Evidence suggested that a white man was likely responsible, but the case has never been officially solved. McMillian's former cellmate, Anthony Ray Hinton, remained on death row for 28 years. Stevenson handled his defense and was eventually able to get all the charges dropped. Hinton was released in 2015.

Cast

Production
Development on the film began in 2015, when Broad Green Pictures hired Destin Daniel Cretton to direct, with Michael B. Jordan set to star. In December 2017, Warner Bros. acquired the distribution rights for the film, after Broad Green Pictures had entered bankruptcy. In July 2018, Jamie Foxx was set to co-star. In August 2018, Brie Larson, O'Shea Jackson Jr. and Tim Blake Nelson also joined the cast, and filming started in Montgomery, Alabama, by August 30. Filming in Atlanta, Georgia, began in September. In October 2018, actors Dominic Bogart, Hayes Mercure and Karan Kendrick were added as well.

Release
The film had its world premiere at the Toronto International Film Festival on September 6, 2019. It received an awards-qualifying limited release on December 25, 2019. Originally set to expand to a wide release on January 17, 2020, the film's expanded distribution was moved up to January 10, 2020, when it opened in 2,375 theaters. In response to the murder of George Floyd, Warner Bros. Pictures made the film free on various streaming platforms during June 2020 to educate the public about systemic racism.

On June 19, 2020, TBS, TNT, and truTV aired the film, along with the 2018 superhero film Black Panther, in which Jordan also starred, to support social justice in celebration of Juneteenth. The broadcast was presented by Anthony Anderson and featured interviews with Bryan Stevenson, along with U.S. Senator Kamala Harris and comic and TV host W. Kamau Bell.

Reception

Critical response
The site's critics consensus reads: "Just Mercy dramatizes a real-life injustice with solid performances, a steady directorial hand, and enough urgency to overcome a certain degree of earnest advocacy." On Metacritic, the film has a weighted average score of 68 out of 100 based on 50 critics, indicating "generally favorable reviews". Audiences polled by CinemaScore gave the film a rare average grade of "A+" on an A+ to F scale, and PostTrak reported it received an average 4.5 out of 5 stars, with 73% of people saying they would definitely recommend it.

Box office
Just Mercy grossed $36 million in the United States and Canada, and $14.4 million in other territories, for a worldwide total of $50.4 million.

On its first day of limited release, the film was opened alongside Spies in Disguise, Little Women, and 1917; the wide expansion of Uncut Gems occurred this date. The film made $81,072 from four theaters. Just Mercy made $105,000 in its opening weekend, December 27–29, for a five-day total of $228,072.

The film grossed $425,862 over the 15 days of limited release. It took in $3.7 million on the first day of wide release, including $800,000 from Thursday-night previews. The film made a total of $10 million over the weekend, finishing fourth at the box office. Just Mercy grossed $5.8 million over its second weekend of wide release, and $7.5 million over the full four-day Martin Luther King Jr. Day holiday, finishing seventh.

Accolades

See also
 List of black films of the 2010s

References

External links
 
 

2019 films
2019 drama films
2019 biographical drama films
2010s American films
2010s English-language films
2010s legal drama films
African-American films
American biographical drama films
American legal drama films
Films about capital punishment
Films directed by Destin Daniel Cretton
Films scored by Joel P. West
Films set in 1989
Films set in Alabama
Films shot in Alabama
Films shot in Atlanta
Films with screenplays by Destin Daniel Cretton
Films with screenplays by Andrew Lanham
Warner Bros. films